Stanley's Dragon is a 1994's British family fantasy TV miniseries on CITV starring Judd Trichter and Mia Fothergill.

Plot

The film takes place in present-day England. Stanley (Trichter) is an American exchange student who, upon becoming separated from his friends in a cavern, finds an unusual rock. He and his friend Rosie (Fothergill) take it home and wash it, discovering it is actually an egg. Rosie suspects it is a dinosaur egg, but when it hatches, they discover the creature inside is actually a dragon. The dragon grows quickly and they name him "Olly". However, Olly is appropriated by the local authorities, who put him in a zoo. Suspecting Olly may be the last of his kind, Stanley endeavours to free him.

Cast
 Judd Trichter	- Stanley Katz
 Mia Fothergill - Rosie Bennett
 Milton Johns - Mr. Batley
 Paul Venables - Henry Driver
 Jeremy Nicholas - Mr. Fuller
 Carol MacReady - Mrs. Batley
 Peter Cellier - Mr. Johnson
 David Roper - Inspector Walsh
 David Ellison - Sgt. Appleyard
 John Horsley as Mr. Little

Nominations

It was nominated for the British Academy Television Award for Best Children's Programme - Fiction or Entertainment.

References

External links 
 
 

1994 British television series debuts
1994 British television series endings
1990s British children's television series
1994 fantasy films
ITV children's television shows
1990s British television miniseries
British children's fantasy television series
British television shows featuring puppetry
English-language television shows
Television series by ITV Studios
Films about dragons
Television shows set in England
Television shows produced by Central Independent Television